The Central Valley Sandstone is a geologic formation in New York. It preserves fossils dating back to the Devonian period.

See also 
 List of fossiliferous stratigraphic units in New York

References 

Devonian geology of New York (state)
Devonian southern paleotemperate deposits